Oleksandr Oleksandrovych Tomakh (born 17 October 1948 in Minsk, Belarusian SSR) is a retired Soviet football player and a Ukrainian coach.

After Retirement
In 2004, the president of Desna Chernihiv, Ivan Chaus appointed as coach of the club of the city of Chernihiv. He managed to win the Ukrainian Second League in the season 2005–06 and having in his team Andriy Yarmolenko and Oleksandr Kozhemyachenko top scorer of the Ukrainian Second League in the season 2004–05.

Honours
Desna Chernihiv
 Ukrainian Second League: 2005–06

See also
 Oleksandr Tomakh (footballer born 1993)
 History of FC Desna Chernihiv

References

External links
  Interview
  Dossier on Tomakh at politrada.com

1948 births
Living people
Footballers from Minsk
Belarusian emigrants to Ukraine
Soviet footballers
Ukrainian footballers
FC Metalurh Zaporizhzhia players
FC Dnipro players
Higher School of Coaches alumni
Ukrainian football managers
FC Metalurh Zaporizhzhia managers
FC Nyva Vinnytsia managers
FC Polissya Zhytomyr managers
FC Desna Chernihiv managers
FC Systema-Boreks Borodianka managers
Ukrainian Premier League managers
Association football midfielders